Alessandro Minelli (born 20 December 1948) is an Italian biologist, formerly professor of zoology in the Faculty of Mathematical, Physical and Natural Sciences of the University of Padova mainly working on evo-devo subjects.

Biography
Alessandro Minelli studied Natural Sciences at the University of Padova 1966–70 with a master's degree in 1970. From 1987 to 2011, Minelli was a Full Professor of Zoology at the University of Padova.

Activity in international organisations
International Commission on Zoological Nomenclature (member since 1989, president 1995–2001)
European Society for Evolutionary Biology (vice-president 1997–99)
Editorial activity in several zoological journals.

Academic memberships
Accademia Nazionale delle Scienze, detta dei LX
Accademia Nazionale Italiana di Entomologia
Istituto Veneto di Scienze Lettere ed Arti
Istituto Lombardo Accademia di Scienze e Lettere
Accademia Olimpica
Ateneo di Treviso
Honorary Fellow of the Accademia Gioenia di Catania.
Honorary Fellow of the Royal Entomological Society of London.

Scientific contributions
Minelli is known for his studies in evolutionary developmental biology, or evo-devo. His main contributions are about the conceptual foundations of this discipline. In his search for an intellectual framework common to evolutionary biology and developmental biology, he has strongly argued against the widespread adultocentrism, that is, interpreting development, in a more or less distinct teleological vein, as a process targeted to the production of an adult animal or plant. 
At variance with the most popular trend in evo-devo, which is based on comparative developmental genetics and has a clear focus on early stages of embryonic development, the approach defended by Minelli is strongly rooted in comparative morphology and aims to extend to postembryonic development. His approach moves from a revisitation of the traditional concepts of homology. According to Minelli, the homology relationships between two structures is necessarily limited to selected features of those structures, thus requiring the adoption a factorial, or combinatorial concept of homology.
Minelli has introduced new concepts, such as axis paramorphism  (useful for understanding the evolutionary relationships between the main axis of the body and its appendages) and those of eosegment and merosegment, through which he suggests a radical revisitation of the architecture of the body of segmented animals. Minelli has also explored the implication of evo-devo for biological systematics, speciation and the evolution of life cycles.

Publications

Books
Minelli A. – Plant Evolutionary Developmental Biology. Cambridge: Cambridge University Press (2018).
Minelli A. – Perspectives in Animal Phylogeny and Evolution. xiii+345 pp. Oxford: Oxford University Press (Jan. 2009) 
Minelli A. – Forms of Becoming. 242 pp. Princeton: Princeton University Press (April 2009).  [Italian: Forme del divenire. xiii+218 pp. Einaudi, Torino (2007)]
Minelli A. & Fusco G. (eds.) Evolving Pathways. Key Themes in Evolutionary Developmental Biology. xviii+426 pp. Cambridge: Cambridge University Press (2008).  
Minelli A., Ortalli G. & Sanga G. (eds.) – Animal Names. Venezia: Istituto Veneto di Scienze Lettere ed Arti. ix+574 pp. (2005).
Minelli A. – Evo-Devo. 109 pp. Roma: Nuova Argos (2004).
Minelli A. – The Development of Animal Form. Cambridge-New York, Cambridge University Press (2003).

Awards
Golden Medal 2002 for the Physical and Natural Sciences awarded by the Italian Accademia Nazionale delle Scienze detta dei XL
Ferrari-Soave Prize 2005 (Animal Biology) awarded by the Accademia delle Scienze, Turin, Italy
Sherborn Award 2008 for outstanding service to biodiversity informatics

References

External links
 A. Minelli Personal Webpage at the University of Padua

Evolutionary biologists
1948 births
Living people
Myriapodologists
Italian zoologists
University of Padua alumni
Academic staff of the University of Padua